Flyboys is a 2006 war drama film set during World War I, starring James Franco, Martin Henderson, Jean Reno, Jennifer Decker, David Ellison, Abdul Salis, Philip Winchester, and Tyler Labine. It was directed by Tony Bill, a pilot and aviation enthusiast. The screenplay about men in aerial combat was written by Phil Sears, Blake T. Evans and David S. Ward with the story by Blake T. Evans. Themes of friendship, racial prejudice, revenge and love are also explored in the film.

The film follows the enlistment, training, and combat experiences of a group of young Americans who volunteer to become fighter pilots in the Lafayette Escadrille, the 124th air squadron formed by the French in 1916. The squadron consisted of five French officers and 38 American volunteers who wanted to fly and fight in World War I before the United States' entry into the war in 1917. The film ends with an epilogue that relates the fate of each American pilot to the real-life Lafayette Escadrille pilot upon whom his character was based.

Plot
In 1916, a group of young Americans go to France to serve in the French Air Service, L'Aéronautique militaire during World War I. The recruits are under the command of French Captain Georges Thenault, with veteran flying ace Reed Cassidy as their mentor.

The pilots struggle to meet the demands of flying, preparing for the aerial dogfights that dominate missions to the front lines. Pilot Blaine Rawlings meets a young woman named Lucienne after his plane runs out of fuel and crashes during a practice flight, and over time they grow a relationship despite her hesitations about his risky profession.

On their first mission, escorting bombers to attack a German ammunition depot Jametz, the rookie pilots are ambushed by Germans. Two are killed in the battle (Toddman and Dewitt), and a third (Nunn) successfully makes an emergency landing, but is killed on the ground by "The Black Falcon", a German pilot flying a black aircraft; the more chivalrous German pilot Franz Wolferd shakes his head in disapproval.

During a later battle, Rawlings' machine gun jams; Wolferd – the pilot he was chasing – flies beside him and salutes before banking away, sparing his opponent's life as penance for the unfair killing of Nunn on the ground. Higgins is killed during the battle, and Jensen breaks that night, unable to fly anymore due to shock. Beagle is accused of being a spy due to faked personal information, but comes clean about a crime he committed in the states and is allowed to stay on.

When the Germans attack a column of civilians, the American pilots head off to stop them. Rawlings kills Wolferd during the engagement after sparing him once when the German dives after another American. Beagles plane is brought down over no-mans land, with the plane pinning his hand. Rawlings lands his plane and make his way to Beagle, but can't free him and so is forced to chop his hand off to get him to safety, with the help of a few French soldiers that left the trenches to free him.

Learning that German forces have advanced into Lucienne's village, Rawlings steals a plane in the middle of the night to rescue them, but Lucienne is wounded and taken to a hospital. Returning to base, he is praised by the commander and awarded the Croix de Guerre medal for bravery.

Ordered to attack a German Zeppelin, Porter is killed and Reed Cassidy is mortally wounded by the Black Falcon, but purposely crashes into the Zeppelin, destroying it. Rawlings reunites with Lucienne before she leaves for Paris. Rawlings’ plane is presented with an eagle, Cassidy's insignia, and he is promoted to Squadron Leader.

After escorting another bomber run on the ammunition depot Jametz, in which Lowry is forced to shoot himself when his plane catches fire, Rawlings takes off to exact revenge on the Black Falcon. Rawlings is attacked by multiple enemy planes, but Jensen, who had broken down earlier but decided to keep flying, helps him shoot down all the enemy fighters except the Black Falcon. With the enemy fighters shot down, Rawlings engages in a dogfight with the Falcon. After being bested in combat and wounded, Rawlings comes alongside and fatally shoots the Black Falcon with his pistol. Rawlings and his squadron return to base.

The film ends by showing what the survivors did after the battle. Jensen flies for the rest of the war; returning to Nebraska, he receives a hero's welcome. Skinner enlists in the US Army but is kept from flying due to his race; he later joins the Airmail Service. Beagle marries an Italian woman and starts a flying circus. Rawlings goes to Paris but does not find Lucienne. He builds one of the largest ranches in Texas, but never flies again.

Cast
 James Franco as Blaine Rawlings: A Texan faced with the foreclosure of his family ranch in Texas, who decides to enlist after seeing a newsreel of aerial combat in France.
 Martin Henderson as Reed Cassidy (a character based upon the real Raoul Lufbery, evident in the references to the squadron mascot, Whiskey the lion): A fellow American, womanizer, traumatized ace pilot, and the pilots' mentor.
 Jean Reno as Georges Thenault: The commander of the Lafayette Escadrille 
 Jennifer Decker as Lucienne: A French girl who lives with her orphan nephews and niece. Rawlings's love interest. 
 Abdul Salis as Eugene Skinner (based on Eugene Bullard, the first African-American military pilot): An African-American boxer, who has been accepted as an athlete in France, and is motivated to "pay back" his adopted country.
 Philip Winchester as William Jensen: An American man from Lincoln, Nebraska. Coming from a military family, he tries his best to make his family proud.
 Tyler Labine as Briggs Lowry: A Dilettante who joins the army because of his overbearing father.
 David Ellison as Eddie Beagle: A petty thief who joined up in hopes of evading repercussions.
 Tim Pigott-Smith as Mr. Lowry: Briggs's overbearing father.
 Gunnar Winbergh as "The Black Falcon": A ruthless German Captain Ace pilot, Cassidy's nemesis. Likely inspired by the Red Baron.

Production
In writing the original drafts that formed the basis of the final screenplay, Tony Bill made an effort to incorporate the real-life adventures of a number of American World War I expatriates who served in both the Lafayette Escadrille and the Lafayette Flying Corps, although pseudonyms were used throughout.

The casting of Franco in an action feature at the time was considered a "stepping stone" to his rise as marquee player and movie star.

The film was shot on location in the United Kingdom primarily in spring 2005 although principal photography continued on into the summer. The trench scenes were shot in Hatfield, Hertfordshire, the same location used for Band of Brothers and Saving Private Ryan. The airfield and aerial shots were filmed on and above RAF Halton (near Aylesbury) where hangars, mess rooms and officers quarters were built adjacent to Splash Covert Woods. All scenery and props were removed when filming ended. The interior shots of the chateau were filmed at RAF Halton's officers' mess, Halton House. Some interiors and studio green-screen work were filmed at Elstree Film and Television Studios in Borehamwood, Hertfordshire.

The film was financed privately outside the standard Hollywood studio circuit by a group of filmmakers and investors, including producer Dean Devlin and pilot David Ellison, son of Oracle Corp. founder Larry Ellison; both spent more than $60 million of their own money to make and market "Flyboys".

The Nieuport 17s featured in the film included four replicas built by Airdrome Aeroplanes, an aircraft company based outside of Kansas City, Missouri. The other aircraft used were a mix of authentic aircraft (the Nieuport 17 that Franco used throughout filming was an original combat aircraft from Kermit Weeks' collection in Florida, specially brought over for the film) and replicas including Nieuport 17s, a sole Sopwith 1 1/2 Strutter and a number of Fokker Dr.I replicas.

In preparing for the starring role, Franco took flying lessons. All the other main actors, except Jean Reno, were filmed in actual aircraft in anticipation of using the aerial footage in final scenes. (Reno pointedly refused the offer, with a "No thanks, I'm afraid of flying." admission). Very little other than Franco's closeups in a cockpit ultimately made it to the screen.

Historical accuracy
Flyboys has been widely criticized for its lack of historical accuracy. The most serious lapse was the blending of the Lafayette Escadrille with the Lafayette Flying Corps, a sub-unit where the real-life Eugene Bullard actually served.

Various details of World War I fighter aircraft technology shown in the film were inaccurate. For example, the aircraft engines in the CGI scenes are pictured as not moving. On the rotary engines used in some early aircraft, the engine case and cylinders rotated, with the crankshaft bolted to the airframe. The spinning of the cylinders improved cooling and allowed for fewer parts, making the engine simpler and lighter.  The propeller was attached to the crankcase (the opposite of radial engines). One operating rotary engine appears in a scene that takes place in the repair hangar. The Nieuport and Fokker aircraft used in the movie are flying replicas built with new radial engines, due to the unavailability of original-type rotary engines. This detail can be briefly seen in the final combat when the black Fokker is taking off after Rawling's ground attack at the German airfield.

In the scene where Beagle is rescued, some of the German soldiers in the trench were shown wearing the Pickelhaube. By 1916, the helmet was no longer in use by frontline soldiers. It had been replaced with the Stahlhelm, which significantly reduced the number of head injuries suffered by German soldiers.

In many scenes with Lucienne, Rawling's aircraft has a British roundel rather than a French one, which have red at the outer border.

Another error is that the American pilots are operating the Nieuport 17, while the Germans are operating the Fokker Dr.I, which entered front line service some time after the Nieuport 17 was no longer operational.

The singular use of Fokker Triplanes, which were not in widespread operational use, is contentious and  almost every Triplane was also painted red in the film, indicating that the Triplane was in Jasta 11, the "all-red" unit. Despite this the remaining pre-production aircraft, designated Dr.I, were delivered to Jasta 11 and Idflieg issued a production order for 100 triplanes in September, followed by an order for 200 in November 1917. On the director/producer commentary track for the DVD release, Producer Dean Devlin noted that they were aware the predominant use of red triplanes was historically inaccurate, but wanted to give clear visual signals to the audience to enable them to easily distinguish friend from foe in the aerial sequences.

The film's only military adviser for the entire project was Jack Livesey, a convicted defrauder, who fabricated his résumé and military service to gain employment as an administrative assistant at the Imperial War Museum, London. Livesey was charged and convicted with fraudulently claiming £30,000.00 in benefits. Livesey had served three years in the British Army Catering Corps. His claims of service in Northern Ireland, the Falklands conflict and that he was a curator of The Imperial War Museum were not true.

In the film, the RMS Aquitania is depicted as a luxury liner; however, in early 1914, she was converted to use as an armed merchant cruiser, and by 1915 had been put into use as a troop transport ship, painted with dazzle style camouflage; however, the film might have used it to demonstrate the style of transport ships during the war.

Release

Critical reception

Flyboys received mixed to negative reviews, based on the hackneyed dialogue and inconsistency of the plot. Review aggregator website Rotten Tomatoes reports an approval rating of 33% based on 127 reviews, with an average rating of 4.91/10. The site's critics' consensus reads: "A poorly scripted history-rewriting exercise with mediocre acting and unconvincing CGI battle scenes." On Metacritic, the film has an aggregated score of 47 out of 100 based on 22 reviews, indicating "mixed or average reviews".

Box office
The film opened at #4 at the domestic box office, grossing $6,004,219 from 2,033 theaters, an average of $2,953 per auditorium. The bottom then fell out, the film dropping a whopping 61% in its second weekend. Flyboys ended up with a total domestic gross of $13,090,620, $4,744,235 internationally, and a total worldwide gross of $17,834,865. Variety named it one of the 10 biggest box office flops of the year.

See also
 The Legion of the Condemned (1928)
 Lafayette Escadrille (1958)

References

Citations

Bibliography

 Farmer, Jim. "The Making of Flyboys." Air Classics, Vol. 42, No. 11, November 2006.
 Winchester, Jim, ed. "Fokker DR.1: JG 1". Biplanes, Triplanes and Seaplanes (Aviation Factfile). London: Grange Books plc, 2004. .

External links

 
 
 
 
 

2006 films
2006 romantic drama films
2000s war drama films
British romantic drama films
British war drama films
American romantic drama films
American war drama films
2000s French-language films
2000s German-language films
Films scored by Trevor Rabin
World War I films based on actual events
Films set in the 1910s
Films set in 1916
Lafayette Escadrille
Military fiction
Western Front (World War I) films
American World War I films
British World War I films
World War I aviation films
Films shot at Elstree Film Studios
Skydance Media films
Metro-Goldwyn-Mayer films
Films directed by Tony Bill
2000s English-language films
2000s American films
2000s British films
Films set in New York City
Films set in Paris
Films set in Texas
Films set in Nebraska